The Royal Academies are independent organizations, founded on Royal command, that act to promote the arts, culture, and science in Sweden. The Swedish Academy and Academy of Sciences are also responsible for the selection of Nobel Prize laureates in Literature, Physics, Chemistry, and the Prize in Economic Sciences. Also included in the Royal Academies are scientific societies that were granted Royal Charters.

Arts and culture
Swedish Academy (Svenska Akademien), 1786
Royal Swedish Academy of Fine Arts (Kungl. Akademien för de Fria konsterna), 1773
Royal Swedish Academy of Music (Kungl. Musikaliska Akademien), 1771
Royal Swedish Academy of Letters, History and Antiquities (Kungl. Vitterhets-, Historie- och Antikvitetsakademien), 1753

Sciences
Royal Swedish Academy of Sciences (Kungl. Vetenskapsakademien), 1739
Royal Swedish Academy of Engineering Sciences (Kungl. Ingenjörsvetenskapsakademien), 1919
Royal Swedish Academy of Agriculture and Forestry (Kungl. Skogs- och Lantbruksakademien), 1813

Military
Royal Swedish Academy of War Sciences (Kungl. Krigsvetenskapsakademien), 1796
Royal Swedish Society of Naval Sciences (Kungl. Örlogsmannasällskapet), 1771

Societies with a royal charter
Royal Society of Sciences in Uppsala (Kungl. Vetenskapssocieteten i Uppsala), 1710
Royal Physiographic Society in Lund (Kungl. Fysiografiska Sällskapet i Lund), 1772
Royal Society of Sciences and Letters in Gothenburg (Kungl. Vetenskaps- och Vitterhetssamhället i Göteborg), 1759
Royal Society of the Humanities at Uppsala (Kungl. Humanistiska Vetenskaps-Samfundet i Uppsala), 1889
Royal Society of the Humanities in Lund (Kungl. Humanistiska Vetenskapssamfundet i Lund), 1918
Royal Gustavus Adolphus Academy in Uppsala (Kungl. Gustav Adolfs Akademien), 1932
Royal Society of Arts and Sciences of Uppsala (Kungl. Vetenskapssamhället i Uppsala), 1954
Royal Skyttean Society in Umeå (Kungl. Skytteanska Samfundet), 1956

References

 
Learned societies of Sweden